Amazonino Armando Mendes (16 November 1939 – 12 February 2023) was a Brazilian politician. He served as the Governor of the Brazilian state of Amazonas for three non-consecutive tenures.

Mendes was born in Eirunepé, Amazonas. He first served as governor from 1987 until 2 April 1990, when he resigned from office to run for the Federal Senate. He was elected governor in 1995, serving from 1995 until 2003. In 2017, Mendes was elected Governor of Amazonas succeeding David Almeida, who assumed office as interim governor following the Superior Electoral Court impeachment of former Governor José Melo and former Vice Governor Henrique Oliveira. As a result, the president of the Legislative Assembly of Amazonas State assumed office until the elections were held on the 6 and 27 August.

Mendes died from pneumonia on 12 February 2023, at the age of 83.

See also
 List of mayors of Manaus

References

1939 births
2023 deaths
Governors of Amazonas (Brazilian state)
Mayors of Manaus
Podemos (Brazil) politicians
Democratic Labour Party (Brazil) politicians
Brazilian Labour Party (current) politicians
Democrats (Brazil) politicians
Liberal Front Party (Brazil) politicians
Progressistas politicians
Reform Progressive Party politicians
Brazilian Democratic Movement politicians
Democratic Social Party politicians
Federal University of Amazonas alumni